Spirits and August Light is the debut full-length album by Finnish melodic death metal band Omnium Gatherum, released in 2003.

Track listing

Credits
Omnium Gatherum
Antti Filppu - Vocals
Markus Vanhala - Guitar
Harri Pikka - Guitar
Janne Markkanen - Bass
Mikko Pennanen - Keyboards
Jarmo Pikka - Drums

Additional performers
Jukka Pelkonen – vocals on "Deathwhite" and "Son`s Thoughts"
Kasperi Heikkinen – guitar solo on "The Perfumed Garden"

Production
Nino Laurenne – Recording, Mixing
Mika Jussila – Mastering
Olli Lappalainen – Art direction, Design, Photography

References

2003 albums
Omnium Gatherum albums